The Programme is a twelve-issue comic book limited series published by Wildstorm. All issues are written by Peter Milligan and drawn by C. P. Smith.

Plot 
The comic builds upon the idea that during the Cold War the superpowers Russia and USA built super-powered beings that should be used in case of a war. The story takes place in modern times when these beings wake up.

Collected editions 
There are two trade paperbacks that contain collected issues.

Notes

References

External links 
 Peter Milligan Gets with "The Programme", Comic Book Resources, July 19, 2007
 Preview of issue #10, Comic Book Resources

Reviews
 Comics Should Be Good >> Programme #1, Comic Book Resources
 The Programme #1, 3 and 4, Comics Bulletin
 The Programme #1, Broken Frontier

2007 comics debuts
Comics by Peter Milligan
WildStorm limited series